Marshall Lang may refer to:
Marshall Lang (father) (1834–1909), Moderator of the General Assembly of the Church of Scotland for 1893
Marshall Lang (son) (1868–1954), Moderator of the General Assembly of the Church of Scotland for 1935